One Night with You is a 1932 Italian "white-telephones" comedy film directed by Ferruccio Biancini and E. W. Emo and starring Elsa Merlini, Nino Besozzi, and Ugo Ceseri. It was made as a MLV, with a German version Little Girl, Great Fortune also released.

Cast

References

Bibliography

External links 
 

1932 comedy films
Italian comedy films
1932 films
1930s Italian-language films
Films directed by Ferruccio Biancini
Films directed by E. W. Emo
Italian multilingual films
Films scored by Fred Raymond
Italian black-and-white films
1932 multilingual films
1930s Italian films